Beaver Township is the name of several places in the U.S. state of Minnesota:

 Beaver Township, Aitkin County, Minnesota
 Beaver Township, Fillmore County, Minnesota
 Beaver Township, Roseau County, Minnesota

See also 
 Beaver Bay Township, Lake County, Minnesota
 Beaver Creek Township, Rock County, Minnesota
 Beaver Falls Township, Renville County, Minnesota
 Beaver Township (disambiguation)

Minnesota township disambiguation pages